Daniel D. Foreman (born 1953) is an American politician who served as a member of the Idaho Senate from 2016 to 2018. He represented the 5th district, which covers parts of Benewah and Latah counties.

Early life and education
Foreman was born in Lake Forest, Illinois. He earned a Bachelor of Science degree in business management and administration Bradley University in 1975.

Career
He served in the United States Air Force for 30 years and retired as a colonel. He later as a police officer with the Moscow Police Department. Foreman was elected to the Idaho Senate in 2016, narrowly defeating incumbent Democratic Senator Dan Schmidt.

Foreman introduced several bills to the legislature during his first weeks in office, including one that would "classify abortion as first-degree murder — for the mother, as well as the doctor who performs the operation — except in cases where the mother’s life is endangered." He also introduced a bill that would reduce Idaho's sales tax from 6% to 5%, as well as two other tax bills.

Foreman denies climate change, referring to it as a "scam". He does not support the separation of church and state.

Controversy

Foreman claimed to be the victim of an online identity-theft hoax when on February 20, 2018, State Senator Maryanne Jordan confirmed she had filed an ethics complaint against Foreman after an unverified Twitter account claiming to be owned by Foreman indicated that a group of students should discuss "killing babies" with her.

Foreman reportedly had been scheduled to meet with college students from the University of Idaho who were advocating for birth control and sex education. After cancelling the meeting at the last minute, Foreman was recorded yelling at the students as he passed them in the hallway, telling them, "abortion is murder".

Foreman has been a vocal critic of his own district, calling the area a "cesspool of liberalism".

Foreman was defeated in the November 2018 elections, losing to Democrat David Nelson, receiving 8,777 votes to Nelson's 11,197 votes.

Personal life
Foreman and his wife, Maria, have 7 children and 20 grandchildren. Foreman refers to himself as "a Christian, conservative Republican."

Electoral history

2016

2018

References

1953 births
Living people
Bradley University alumni
Republican Party Idaho state senators
People from Latah County, Idaho
21st-century American politicians
United States Air Force colonels
People from Lake Forest, Illinois
Military personnel from Illinois